Thai Vietjet Air JSC Limited, operating as Thai VietJet Air, also recognized as Vietjet Air Thailand (or simply Thai Vietjet), is a low-cost airline from Thailand and an associate company of Vietnamese airline VietJet Air.

History 
Thai VietJet Air received its Air Operator's Certificate in November 2014. The carrier commenced operations on 29 March 2015 from its operating base in Bangkok's Suvarnabhumi Airport to Phuket International Airport. The airline plans to launch services to Udon Thani later.

The airline started operations on 5 December 2014 with a charter flight from Bangkok to Gaya.

Destinations

Fleet

, Thai VietJet Air operates the following aircraft:

Accidents and incidents

9 April 2022: Thai VietJet Flight 320 from Bangkok–Suvarnabhumi to Hat Yai returned to Suvarnabhumi Airport to make an emergency landing after flight crew noticed avionic smoke during climb passing 4,000 ft. There were no casualties and the incident is under investigation.

References

Airlines of Thailand
Airlines established in 2014
Low-cost carriers
Thai companies established in 2014